The European Union Monitor Mission Medal (EUMM) is a medal which recognizes service with the European Union Monitoring Mission in the former Yugoslavia which ran from 2000-2007. It is the successor medal to the European Community Monitor Mission Medal.

History
Originally called the European Community Monitor Mission (ECMM), the mission came about as part of the Brijuni Agreement of 8 July 1991, which ended hostilities between Slovenia and Yugoslavia.  This mission was to monitor the withdrawal of the Yugoslav People's Army from Slovenia.  As the conflict spread, so did the mission to monitor in Croatia and Bosnia-Herzegovina. The mission was renamed to the European Union Monitor Mission in 2000. The mission ended in 2007.

Criteria
The medal was awarded for 30 days of cumulative service within the EU theatre of operations. For those members of the mission who are killed while assigned to the monitor mission, there is no minimum period of service. The medal could be awarded posthumously.

Appearance
The obverse  depicts twelve stars, in relief,  around the outer edge with a raised rim. In the centre are the letters EU. The reverse shows a dove, in flight, with an olive branch in its beak. Around the edge are the words EUROPEAN UNION MONITORING MISSION.

Order of wear
Some orders of wear are as follows:

References

Orders, decorations, and medals of the European Union
Awards established in 2000
Awards disestablished in 2007
Campaign medals
Yugoslav Wars